Grigorescu (previously called Donath) is a district in the west of Cluj-Napoca in Romania. The district was named after World War I General Eremia Grigorescu in the 1960s. The previous name, Donath, remains associated with the district due to Strada Donath (Donath Street) a main street running through the district.

Public transport
Grigorescu is served by nine of the main CTP bus lines. The 26, 26L, 27, 28, 28B, 30, 41 and 44 run down Octavian Goga and Alexander Vlahuţă-Fântânele towards the city centre. The 43 runs out of the city towards the supermarket Cora and Polus Centre Shopping Mall just outside Grigorescu (also the 28B continues on this route). A separate bus run by the supermarket Cora also runs from Cora through Grigorescu to the city centre.

Buildings
The west of the Grigorescu district consists mostly of apartment blocks built in the communist era, with more traditional houses to the west. Notable buildings include the local headquarters of TVR (Romanian public television), the Ethnographic Museum of Transylvania, the National Institute for Research and Development of Isotopic and Molecular Technology (INCDTIM), and the Grand Hotel Napoca.

Districts of Cluj-Napoca